The Fauvel AV.42 was a (AV for aile volante tail-less tourism cabin monoplane designed, but not built, in France.

Specifications (AV.42)

References

Tailless aircraft
Flying wings
Fauvel aircraft